Cycniopsis is a genus of flowering plants belonging to the family Orobanchaceae.

Its native range is Northeastern and Eastern Tropical Africa, Arabian Peninsula.

Species:

Cycniopsis humifusa 
Cycniopsis humilis

References

Orobanchaceae
Orobanchaceae genera